Match! Game is a Russian pay TV channel. The channel broadcasts in SD 4:3 format. It was founded April 4, 2011 by the All-Russia State Television and Radio Broadcasting Company under the name "Sport-2". From August 13, 2012 to January 25, 2016 the channel was known as "Sport". In October 2015, Gazprom-Media acquired the channel. January 25, 2016 changed its name to "Match! Game".

Programmes 
 Vsyo Vklyucheno (Everything Included): a program from Russia 2

Sports events broadcast by Sport TV 
 Football: Football Championship of the National League
 Biathlon: Russian Championship 2011
 Volleyball: Russian (Men's and women's) championships
 Figure skating: 2011 European Figure Skating Championships
 Athletics: 2011 European Athletics Indoor Championships
 Bandy: Russian Bandy Super League
 Autosport: RCRS, SMP F4 Championship

References

External links 
  

Russian-language television stations in Russia
Television channels and stations established in 2011
2011 establishments in Russia
Sports television networks in Russia